Megaherbivores (Greek μέγας megas "large" and Latin herbivora "herbivore") are large terrestrial herbivores that can exceed  in weight. This polyphyletic group of megafauna includes elephants, rhinos, hippos, and giraffes. There are nine extant species of megaherbivores living in Africa and Asia.

All megaherbivores are keystone species in their environment. Their ecological role is to change the vegetative structure through feeding behavior, and seed dispersal. Megaherbivores like most large mammals are K-selected species. They are characterized by their large size, invulnerability to predators, their impact on vegetation and their dietary tolerance. Megaherbivores have been around for over 300 million years, but they are now extirpated from much of their historic range.

Species 
This is a list of all nine extant species of megaherbivores,  also includes their description.

Ecology 
Elephants are mixed feeders, giraffes and Javan rhinos are browsers, while white and Indian rhinoceroses are true grazers. Megaherbivores consume graminoid, which are  dicotyledon proportions which also includes non-graminaceous monocots with dicots. They prefer eating the foliage, stemmy material and fruits of the plant. Elephants and rhinos exhibit hindgut fermentation while giraffes, like all bovids are ruminants with foregut fermentation. Hippos display foregut fermentation but they lack the distinctly divided section and remastication that are typical in ruminants. 

Due to their size, megaherbivores can defoliate the landscape. Because of this they are considered keystone species in their environment. They use their size, power and feeding behavior to change the structure and composition of vegetation, which affects both the recycling and spread of nutrients, as well as the climate. Megaherbivores can create open landscapes at the cost of forested ones through feeding behavior which over time clears vegetation. They also spread more seeds over a larger distance than smaller frugivores, this then changes the shape of the forested area. As a result, they significantly impact the composition of the species in the ecosystems in which they inhabit.

Their size also causes a slow metabolic rate, which then causes food to be processed in their gut at a leisurely pace. This slow passage through the gut gives time for the disintegration of a high fiber diet and allows natural processing of plant components through microbial activity.

Giraffes on the other hand are susceptible to predation in areas such the Kruger National Park where its not uncommon for lions to prey on adult giraffes.

Evolution 

Megaherbivores were present in earth's terrestrial ecosystems ever since the early Permian (300 mya). The taxonomic structure of megaherbivores switched through time. The first megaherbivores were mammal-like reptiles that lived from the late Palaeozoic to the early Triassic (200 mya). The taxonomic composition then switch to sauropsids. These replacements roughly happen at the same time with changes in the dominant plant groups, or with mass extinction events. Sometimes new megaherbivore groups outcompete previous groups, in other cases animals that did not originally belong to megaherbivores adopt the ecological niche of the previously dominant but now extinct megaherbivore taxa.

Before the Cretaceous-Paleogene mass extinction, all species of megaherbivores were dinosaurs since the late Triassic. The Cretaceous-Paleogene mass extinction (around 66 mya) is the best-known megaherbivore replacement that caused the extirpation of all megaherbivore dinosaurs and the divergence of large herbivorous mammals that evolved from species incomparable in size. Following the extinction of the whole late Cretaceous megaherbivore guild, the evolution of new taxa from different guilds took place. Roughly 10 million years after the mass extinction, mammals attained body sizes of megaherbivores on all continents. There were at least one species of megaherbivore in all continents and in all climates, during cenozoic times and also the Pleistocene before the arrival of modern humans.

The Quaternary Extinction event is an event where many species of megafauna (particularly mammals) went extinct as part of a global, diachronous extinction event. This events caused the disappearances of megaherbivores in most continents on Earth. There were at least 50 species of megaherbivore in the Late Pleistocene. There were about 16 species of Proboscia (elephants, mammoths, etc.), 7 species of Cetartiodactyla (bovids, hippopotamus, camels), 9 species of perissodactylans (rhinoceros), 5 Cingulata (glyptodonts) species, 8 Pilosa (giant sloths) species, 3 Notoungulata (toxodonts) species, and a single species from Liptoterna and Diprotodontia. Today, only nine of the 50 species remain. The Americas saw the worst decline in megaherbivores, losing all 27 species. Climate change and the arrival of humans could be the cause of the extinctions.

Adaptions and size 
Megaherbivores exhibit the following adaptive syndrome: They are tolerant feeders and despite there only being nine extant species of megaherbivores, they comprise nearly half of the large herbivore biomass. Adults are invulnerable to predation and populations are relatively not affected by droughts. Megaherbivores also have a big impact on vegetation.

Size 
In terms of size and weight, megaherbivores are divided into four clusters:
 Cluster i - elephants: 
 Cluster ii - white rhinos, Indian rhinos and hippos: 
 Cluster iii - black rhinos and Javan rhino: 
 Cluster iiii - giraffe:

Reproduction and longevity

Reproduction 

Megaherbivores are k-selected species, meaning they have high lifespans, slow population growth, large offspring, long gestation periods, slow maturation, low mortality rates and no natural predators.

Females in estrous change in behaviour and physiology. This causes males to exhibit courtship behaviors, which then progresses to copulation. Breeding access may be influenced by the dominance relationships between males. Rhinos and hippos copulate for an extended period of time, while elephants and giraffes copulate briefly. Females have long gestation periods between 8 and 22 months. Intervals between births vary between species but the overall range is 1.3 to 4.5 years.

They usually give birth to a single calf. During the early stages of life, neonatals are totally dependent on their mothers for food and protection. As they get older, the calf starts weaning while still suckling. When they reach juvenility, they become less dependent on their mothers for food and protection. Juvenility typically ends when the mother chases her offspring, however in a few species adolescents may associate themselves with their mothers.

Lifespan and mortality 
Megaherbivores have high life expectancies. The potential lifespan of a hippopotamus or rhinoceros is around 40 years, while that of an elephant is around 60 years. Giraffes have a potential lifespan of 25 years.

Megaherbivores exhibit a low mortality rate from natural causes as they reach adulthood, about 2 to 5% per annum. Males have higher mortality rates due to injuries from fights. Giraffes are the only species who are at risk to significant predation. Severe droughts can cause occasionally high mortality rates, especially with calves.

See also 
 Australian megafauna
 Deep-sea gigantism
 Largest and heaviest animals

References 

Extinction
Zoology
Animal size
Herbivorous mammals